The Roman Catholic Diocese of Bungoma is a diocese located in the city of Bungoma in the Ecclesiastical province of Kisumu in Kenya.

History
 April 27, 1987: Established as Diocese of Bungoma from the Diocese of Kakamega

Leadership
 Bishops of Bungoma (Roman Rite)
 Bishop Longinus Atundo (27 Apr 1987  – 15 Nov 1996)
 Bishop Norman King’oo Wambua (27 Jun 1998 – 23 Jun 2018), appointed Bishop of Machakos
 Bishop Mark Kadima (14 Dec 2021 – present)

See also
Roman Catholicism in Kenya
Kenya Conference of Catholic Bishops

References

Sources
 GCatholic.org
 Catholic Hierarchy

Roman Catholic dioceses in Kenya
Christian organizations established in 1987
Roman Catholic dioceses and prelatures established in the 20th century
Roman Catholic Ecclesiastical Province of Kisumu